Tésero (Tiézer in local dialect) is a comune (municipality) in Trentino in the northern Italian region Trentino-Alto Adige/Südtirol, located in the Val di Fiemme about  northeast of Trento. 

The municipality of Tesero contains the frazioni (subdivisions, mainly villages and hamlets) Lago, Stava and Alpe di Pampeago.

Tesero borders the following municipalities: Deutschnofen, Predazzo, Panchià, Cavalese, Pieve Tesino and Ville di Fiemme.

The 1985 Val di Stava Dam collapse killed 268 people in Tesero.

Sport

Cross country ski

In the village of Lago, the Lago di Tesero Cross Country Stadium hosts winter events (cross-country ski, biathlon, ice rink games). The stadium was a sport venue of three editions of FIS Nordic World Ski Championships (1991, 2003, and 2013), 2013 Winter Universiade, and many events of the FIS Cross-Country World Cup. Every year it hosts the Mickey Mouse Trophy of Cross-country ski (Trofeo Topolino di sci di fondo), and the Marcialonga passes through.

Other cross-country ski tracks are located in Pampeago and Lavazè Pass.

Alpine ski
Ski Center Latemar at Pampeago offers  of slopes.

Cycling
The Giro d'Italia ended five stages at Pampeago Pass in 1998, 1999, 2003, 2008, and 2012.

See also
Lago di Tesero Cross Country Stadium

References

 

Cities and towns in Trentino-Alto Adige/Südtirol